Bethany is a neighborhood of Louisville, Kentucky located on Dixie Highway (US 31W) by Bethany Cemetery.

Geography 

References

External links
   Images of Bethany (Louisville, Ky.) in the University of Louisville Libraries Digital Collections

Neighborhoods in Louisville, Kentucky